Ulster Township may refer to the following townships in the United States:

 Ulster Township, Floyd County, Iowa
 Ulster Township, Bradford County, Pennsylvania